Youth against Settlements is a Palestinian activist group based in Hebron. It states that it organizes actions against the Israeli occupation of Palestine through non-violent popular struggle and civil disobedience. The group is also represented as NGO in the United Nations Human Rights Council.

Organization 

As of 2012, Youth against Settlements is coordinated by Issa Amro.

Activities 

Youth Against Settlements (YAS) has been leading the Open Shuhada Street Campaign (OSC), a global campaign to re-open Shuhada Street.

Besides the international Annual Open Shuhada Street demonstrations, YAS also organizes the weekly protests throughout the Occupied Palestinian territories. In May 2012, Akram Natsheh spoke at a United Nations International Meeting in Paris.

In March 2014, Issa Amro held a presentation at the United Nations Human Rights Council (UNHRC) in Geneva.

During the spate of violence in late 2015, YAS activist Sohaib Zahda published an editorial in the International Business Times criticising the ongoing occupation of Palestine as the cause of the violence, as well as the complicity of the Palestinian Authority with Israel.

Israel and Youth Against Settlements 

In 2012, Issa Amro was arrested and detained 20 times, and in 2013 until August 6 times. In August 2013, United Nations independent human rights experts expressed deep concern at actions directed against Amro. Right before the session, which was also attended by Amro, Israel sent a summon for him to appear at a Military Court on 30 December 2013, without indication of any charges. On 8 July 2013, the month before the UN meeting, Israeli soldiers took away his identity documents. He was tortured by soldiers and ended up in a hospital.

References

External links
Official website

Hebron
Non-governmental organizations involved in the Israeli–Palestinian conflict
Israeli settlement